Shraddha Das (born 4 March 1987) is an Indian actress and model who predominantly appears in Telugu, Malayalam, Hindi, Bengali, and Kannada language films. She made her acting debut in the 2008 Telugu film Siddu from Sikakulam, and since then has worked across six different film industries throughout her career.

Early life
Shraddha Das was born on Wednesday, 4 March 1987 in Mumbai, Maharashtra to Bengali parents. Her father, Sunil Das, is a businessman, who hails from Purulia and her mother, Sapna Das, is a housewife. She is a Buddhist. She was brought up in Mumbai, where she completed her studies. Shraddha graduated from Ruia college and University of Mumbai at SIES College of Commerce and Economics with a Bachelor of Mass Media degree in journalism.

While doing her graduation she worked in theatres and attended workshops conducted by National School of Drama artists like Piyush Mishra, Chittaranjan Giri and Salim Shah. She also appeared in print advertisements for McDowell's, Aristocrat and over 400 catalogues before training at the Gladrags Academy.

Career
Shraddha's debut release was the 2008 Telugu film Siddu from Sikakulam. After Target, she quickly signed four Telugu films within six months: 18, 20 Love Story, Diary, Adhineta and Sukumar's Arya 2, which was her first high-profile project.

In 2010, Shraddha made her Bollywood debut in Sai Om Films' maiden venture Lahore, directed by Sanjay Puran Singh Chauhan. Lahore was the first film Shraddha acted in; she shot for the film during the final year of college, but delays meant that several other films of her released earlier. Shraddha played a Pakistani psychiatrist in the film and received critical acclaim for her performance. The film, which focuses on India–Pakistan relations, was released in March 2010 and won awards at the 42nd WorldFest-Houston International Film Festival and the 57th National Film Awards. Her other three releases of the year, A. Karunakaran's Darling, Maro Charitra produced by Dil Raju, the remake of the 1978 film of the same name, and P. Vasu's Nagavalli, saw her playing leading roles. Due to her appearances in the sequels of Arya (Arya 2), Mantra (Diary) and Chandramukhi (Nagavalli), Shraddha acquired the nickname "sequel queen". Her second Hindi film was Dil Toh Baccha Hai Ji that released in 2011. In the next two years she appeared in one film each, Hosa Prema Purana and Dracula 2012 which were her Kannada and Malayalam debut, respectively.

After a year, Shraddha made her Bengali debut with The Royal Bengal Tiger (2014). Later that year, she had two Hindi releases, the romantic comedy Lucky Kabootar and the widely publicised Vivek Agnihotri erotic thriller Zid; both films opened to mixed critical response, Shraddha benefited from Zid and received more offers from Bollywood after its release. Prior to the release of Zid, she made the headlines when she accused her co-star Mannara of injuring her during the shooting and hitting her while she was bound and gagged for a scene in the film.

Shraddha has completed three Telugu films, Rey, Bandipotu and Superstar Kidnap. In Rey, she plays an American pop singer and she has stated that her role in the film "is almost on par with that of the hero" and that "There's a certain amount of eccentricity in my character". Superstar Kidnap will see her in the role of a "powerful goon", while Bandipotu will feature her in an item number. She has completed filming a Bollywood film, too, Chai Shai Biscuit, which she had signed before the release of Zid. As of early 2015, she is filming for two bilingual horror films, Ouija, made in Telugu and Kannada, and Haunting of Bombay Mills, made in Telugu and Hindi. She has also been roped to feature in Great Grand Masti.
She later worked in 3 critically and commercially acclaimed films in Telugu (Guntur talkies and Garuda vega), Hindi (Babumoshai Bandookbaaz with Nawazuddin siddiqui) and Bengali (Badsha the Don).
Recently in 2021 she took an interpole officer role in commercial hit kannada movie kotigobba 3 starring 
Kiccha Sudeep.

Filmography

References

External links
 
 
 

Living people
Actresses in Telugu cinema
Bengali actresses
Actresses in Hindi cinema
Actresses in Malayalam cinema
Actresses in Kannada cinema
21st-century Indian actresses
Indian film actresses
Actresses from Mumbai
Actresses in Bengali cinema
Indian Buddhists
21st-century Buddhists
1987 births